Kajow was a small armed steamer who fought for the Imperialist forces during the Taiping Rebellion. It was briefly seized by Taiping troops but recovered.

History
Kajow was under the service of the local futai, and was frequently used by the Scottish diplomat Halliday Macartney for trips between Sunkiang and Shanghai. She was commanded by an American named C. F. Jones, who grew to dislike the Chinese authorities due to his employers "withholding the pay due [him] for nearly a year's employment." Jones eventually stopped working for the Chinese, and was persuaded by his acquaintance Henry Andres Burgevine, an American under the service of the Taiping Heavenly Kingdom, to help capture Kajow.

In August 1863, Macartney, departing from Shanghai, arrived at Sunkiang on Kajow. There, on the morning of 2 August, Burgevine and Jones, together with a group of forty European and Chinese men, captured Kajow. At the time of her capture, Kajow was carrying a "valuable cargo of arms and ammunition". Kajow was then carried to Suzhou. She was later moved to Nanjing where her engines were repaired.

On 1 October, she took part in an unsuccessful attempt to capture Patachiaou. In the following weeks, Burgevine and Jones negotiated with Charles George Gordon, commander of the Imperial Ever Victorious Army, for the surrender of their men and Kajow, citing the fact that they received no pay during their service with the rebels. This plan was not yet carried out when on 12 October, Taiping general Li Xiucheng launched an attack on Monding near Suzhou, against Gordon's forces. Kajow and Jones thus took to battle. At 10 a.m., Kajow was sunk at Tajouka, Wuxi by a "lucky shot" which ignited the magazine of the ship, and the Taiping attack was repelled. Burgevine and Jones surrendered to Gordon, and the wreck of Kajow was recovered by Imperialist forces. Her further fate is not known.

Citations

References

 
 
 
 
 
 
 

Naval ships of Imperial China
Gunboats of China
Naval ships of the Taiping Heavenly Kingdom